Tomalin is a surname (which originated as a diminutive of Thomas or Tom). Notable people with the surname include:
Claire Tomalin (born 1933), English author and journalist
Doug Tomalin, (1914–1998), English diver 
Elisabeth Tomalin (1912–2012), British artist
Nicholas Tomalin (1931–1973), British journalist and writer
Paul Tomalin, British television screenwriter
Philip Tomalin (1856–1940), French cricketer
Ruth Tomalin (1919–2012), British journalist, novelist, and children's author
James Tomalin (born 1972), British composer and music producer

See also 

Tomlin, a similar surname